A total of 144 Olympians are known to have been killed during World War I.

See also
 List of international rugby union players killed in World War I

Notes
A.This includes Hermann von Bönninghausen and Paul Berger, who both died following the war of complications from their war injuries.

B.The country the individual competed for at the time.

References

Military personnel of World War I
Military personnel killed in World War I
Lists of people killed in World War I
Killed In World War I
Lists of sportspeople who died in wars
Olympians killed in warfare